The Battle of Eastern Henan was between the Central Army of Chiang Kai-shek and those of Sun Dianying, a Henan native and ally of Feng Yuxiang and Yan Xishan. Sun's forces attacked the Longhai railway line, a stronghold on the eastern provincial border of Henan. The railway linked the cities of Kaifeng, Zhengzhou and Luoyang.

Bibliography
中華民國國防大學編，《中國現代軍事史主要戰役表》

Conflicts in 1930